Park & Market station is a station of the Blue, Orange, and Silver Lines  on the San Diego Trolley. It is located in the East Village neighborhood of the city and serves the high density residential developments that surround the stop.

This station was renovated from July 9, 2012 until September 2012, as part of the Trolley Renewal Project.

Station layout
There are two tracks, each with a side platform. Silver Line heritage service operates Friday through Sunday only.

See also
 List of San Diego Trolley stations

References

Blue Line (San Diego Trolley)
Orange Line (San Diego Trolley)
Silver Line (San Diego Trolley)
Railway stations in the United States opened in 1981
San Diego Trolley stations in San Diego
1981 establishments in California